Sylvania City School District is a school district in Northwest Ohio. The school district serves students who live in the city of Sylvania, and Sylvania Township in Lucas County. The superintendent is Jane Spurgeon

Grades 9-12
Sylvania Northview High School
Sylvania Southview High School

Grades 6-8
Arbor Hills Junior High School
McCord Junior High School
Timberstone Junior High School

Grades K-5
Central Trail Elementary
Highland Elementary
Hill View Elementary
Maplewood Elementary
Stranahan Elementary
Sylvan Elementary
Whiteford Elementary

External links
District Website

School districts in Ohio
Education in Lucas County, Ohio